Horseed is a district of Marka, a city in the Shabelle Hoose region in southern Somalia. Its geographical coordinates are 1° 45' 0" North, 44° 38' 0" East.

References

Populated places in Lower Shebelle